WCIU may refer to: 

WCIU-TV, a television station in Chicago, Illinois
 William Carey International University, Pasadena, California